Meghan O'Rourke (born 1976 in Brooklyn, New York) is an American nonfiction writer, poet and critic.

Background and education 
O'Rourke was born January 26, 1976, in Brooklyn, New York. The eldest of three children born to Paul and Barbara O’Rourke, she had two younger brothers. Her mother was a longtime teacher and administrator at Saint Ann's, an elite independent school in Brooklyn, and later headmaster of the Pierrepoint School in Westport, Connecticut. Her father, a classicist and Egyptologist, also taught at Saint Ann's and Pierrepont. O'Rourke attended St. Ann's through high school. She earned a bachelor's of arts degree in English language and literature from Yale University in 1997 and a master of fine arts degree in poetry from Warren Wilson College in 2005.

Career

Journalism
Immediately after graduating from Yale, O'Rourke began an internship as an editor at The New Yorker. She was promoted to fiction/nonfiction editor in 2000, becoming one of the youngest editors ever at the publication. During this time, she also freelanced as a contributing editor of the literary quarterly Grand Street. In 2002, O'Rourke moved to the online magazine Slate, serving as culture and literary editor until 2009 and as founding editor of DoubleX, a section of Slate that focused on women’s issues. She also continued to moonlight with other publications; from 2005 to 2010 she was a poetry coeditor of the Paris Review. She is also an occasional contributor to The New York Times. O'Rourke has written on a wide range of topics, including horse racing, gender bias in the literary world, the politics of marriage and divorce, and the place of grief and mourning in modern society. She has published poems in literary journals and magazines including The New Yorker, Best American Poetry, The New Republic, and Poetry, along with Perrine's Literatures Twelfth Edition.

O'Rourke's first book of poems, Halflife, was published by Norton in 2007. Her book The Long Goodbye, a memoir of grief and mourning written after her mother's death, was published to wide critical acclaim in 2011. She lives in Brooklyn, New York. O'Rourke suffers from an autoimmune disorder that she has written about for The New Yorker. Her latest book, The Invisible Kingdom: Reimagining Chronic Illness, was released in March 2022. Publishers Weekly named it one of the top ten books of 2022, regardless of genre.

She has been treated for Lyme disease.

On July 1, 2019, O'Rourke became editor of The Yale Review, coinciding with the 200th anniversary of its founding.

Awards and fellowships
2005: Union League and Civic Arts Foundation Award from the Poetry Foundation
2007: Lannan Literary Award
2008: May Sarton Poetry Prize
2014: Guggenheim Award for General Nonfiction
2017: Whiting Creative Nonfiction Grant to complete her book, What's Wrong With Me? The Mysteries of Chronic Illness

Bibliography

Poetry 
Collections

 Once: Poems (New York: W. W. Norton, 2011).
 Sun In Days (New York: W. W. Norton, 2017).
List of poems

Memoirs
 The Long Goodbye, memoir (New York: Riverhead, 2011).

Anthologies
 ed. A World Out of Reach: Dispatches from Life Under Lockdown (New Haven: Yale University Press, 2020)

References

Sources
 Contemporary Authors Online. The Gale Group, 2006.

Further reading
 Review of Halflife.

External links
 Website: Official website
 Excerpt: An excerpt from The Long Goodbye, in The New Yorker.
 Audio: Meghan O'Rourke reads "Spectacular" from the book Halflife (via poemsoutloud.net)
 Audio: Meghan O'Rourke reading from Halflife at the Key West Literary Seminar, 2008. (.mp3 / 15:44)
 "Chemotherapy," a poem by Meghan O'Rourke published in Guernica Magazine
 Meghan O'Rourke on Twitter

1976 births
Living people
21st-century American poets
Poets from New York (state)
Writers from Brooklyn
The New Yorker people
Yale University alumni
Slate (magazine) people
American women poets
Warren Wilson College alumni
21st-century American women writers
Radcliffe fellows
American women non-fiction writers
21st-century American non-fiction writers